David Georges Greyeyes Steele, CM (31 December 1914 – 22 July 1996) was an Indigenous Canadian war hero, athlete, farmer, and public servant.

Biography 
Born in Muskeg Lake Cree Nation, Greyeyes Steele studied agriculture at the Lebret Industrial Residential School. He played multiple sports, but was particularly successful in soccer: he was a member of the Saskatchewan All-Star team three times and competed internationally.

He, two brothers, and his sister Mary Greyeyes enlisted in the Canadian Army during the Second World War. Greyeyes Steele taught advanced weaponry for two years before returning to Canada to qualify as an officer. He was the first Status Indian to achieve such a commission overseas. He was then assigned to The Saskatoon Light Infantry (Machine Gun) and commanded a mortar platoon in the Italian Campaign. He was awarded the Greek War Cross for his support of the 3rd Greek Mountain Brigade in the Battle of Rimini (1944). After VE Day he served as an intelligence officer with the Royal Winnipeg Rifles during the occupation of Germany. He played soccer in the 1946 Inter-Allied Games.

On his return to Canada, Greyeyes Steele married Flora Jeanne, and in 1958 became chief of the Muskeg Lake Cree Nation. He joined the Indian Affairs Branch of the Department of Citizenship and Immigration, eventually becoming the first Indigenous person named a regional director with this service.

He was named a Member of the Order of Canada and honoured in the Saskatchewan Sports Hall of Fame, both in 1977. He also received the Saskatchewan Order of Merit in 1993 and was an inaugural inductee in the Saskatchewan First Nations Sports Hall of Fame in 1994.

References

External links
Sask First Nations Sports Hall of Fame - David Greyeyes Steele

1914 births
1996 deaths
Cree people
Members of the Order of Canada
Canadian soccer players
Canadian Army soldiers
Indigenous leaders in Saskatchewan
Sportspeople from Saskatchewan
Soccer people from Saskatchewan
Association footballers not categorized by position
Canadian Army officers
Canadian military personnel of World War II
Saskatoon Light Infantry
North Saskatchewan Regiment
Royal Winnipeg Rifles officers
Canadian Indigenous military personnel